Charles Vincent "Charlie the Wop" Carrollo (born Vincenzo Carrollo; August 25, 1902 – 1979) was an Italian-born Kansas City, Missouri crime boss during the 1930s. 

Carrollo was born in Santa Cristina Gela, an Arbëreshë town in the province of Palermo, Sicily, and immigrated with his family to the United States when he was three years old, initially settling in New York City before moving to Kansas City. His father was Antonio Carrollo and his mother Rosa Maria Carrollo.

At some time after 1917, Carrollo became a close friend and enforcer for future Kansas City mob boss John Lazia. During the early 1920s, when Lazia was arrested for bootlegging, Carrollo accepted responsibility for the crime and went to prison for a short time. By the late 1920s, Lazia controlled all organized crime in Kansas City and Carrollo was a top lieutenant.

On the night of July 10, 1934, Carrollo drove Lazia and his wife Marie to their apartment building. When Lazia got out of the car, an unidentified "hit team" gunned him down in a hail of submachine gun fire. Lazia last word's were for Carrollo to drive Marie to safety. Carrollo and Marie Lazia escaped unharmed. The murder was never solved.  With the aid of the Kansas City Pendergast political organization, Carrollo became the new mob boss. Carollo and newly appointed Kansas City police chief Otto Higgins became closely involved in numerous criminal activities. 

In 1939, Treasury Agents under Secretary Henry Morgenthau, Jr. started pursuing Carrollo.  Carrollo responded by refusing any warrants and sending his gunmen to harass the agents. However, on October 20, 1939, Carrollo, Higgins, and Tom Pendergast were convicted of income tax evasion and sent to Leavenworth Federal Penitentiary in Leavenworth, Kansas. While at Leavenworth, Carrollo was discovered trafficking in contraband within the prison and was transferred to Alcatraz, the high security prison in San Francisco Bay. 

Released from prison in 1954, Carrollo was eventually deported to Italy. In 1979, Carrollo died of natural causes in Kansas City.

Further reading
Bernstein, Lee. The Greatest Menace: Organized Crime in Cold War America. Boston: UMass Press, 2002. 
Capeci, Jerry. The Complete Idiot's Guide to the Mafia. Indianapolis: Alpha Books, 2002. 
United States. Congress. Senate. Committee on Governmental Affairs. Permanent Subcommittee on Investigations. Organized Crime and Use of Violence: hearings before the Permanent Subcommittee on Investigations. 1980. 
United States. Congress. Senate. Committee on Governmental Affairs. Permanent Subcommittee on Investigations. Organized Crime: 25 Years After Valachi: Hearings Before the Permanent Subcommittee on Investigations. 1988.

References
Kelly, Robert J. Encyclopedia of Organized Crime in the United States. Westport, Connecticut: Greenwood Press, 2000. 
Nash, J. Robert. World Encyclopedia of Organized Crime New York: First Paragon House, 1992
Sifakis, Carl. The Mafia Encyclopedia. New York: Da Capo Press, 2005. 
Sifakis, Carl. The Encyclopedia of American Crime. New York: Facts on File Inc., 2001. 

1979 deaths
American gangsters of Sicilian descent
Kansas City crime family
Mafia hitmen
American crime bosses
1902 births
American people convicted of tax crimes
Italian emigrants to the United States